Gustav Erik Ludwigson (born 20 October 1993) is a Swedish footballer who plays as a forward or as a second striker for K League 1 club Ulsan Hyundai.

Club career

Early career
Ludwigson started to play football with local club Mölnycke IF. In 2015, he transferred to Sävedalens IF.

In total, Ludwigson would go on to score 23 goals in 60 league games for Sävedalen across three seasons. He helped the club to win a promotion to Division 2, Sweden's fourth tier, before leaving in 2017.

Örgryte IS
On 21 December 2017, Ludwigson signed a one-year contract with Örgryte IS in Superettan, the domestic second tier. He had previously gone on trial with the club twice in his career.

In his first season at the club, Ludwigson scored 11 goals and featured in all 30 league games. In August 2018, he extended his contract until 2020. Örgryte finished 4th in the 2018 Superettan table, and at the end of season Ludwigson was voted as Player of the Year by the fans of the club.

Ludwigson retained his fine form in 2019, and won the prize of Superettan Player of the Month in July.

Hammarby IF

2020
On 8 August 2019, it was announced that Ludwigson would join Hammarby IF in Allsvenskan ahead of the 2020 season. He signed a three-year deal with the club, and reports suggested a transfer fee of around 0,5 million Swedish kronor. In his debut season in 2020, Ludwigson scored nine goals and provided 11 assists in 29 league games, being voted as Hammarby Player of the Year by the supporters of the club, although the side disappointedly finished 8th in the Allsvenskan table.

2021
On 26 March 2021, Ludwigson renewed his contract with Hammarby, with his new deal running until the end of 2024. On 30 May 2021, Ludwigson won the 2020–21 Svenska Cupen, the main domestic cup, with Hammarby through a 5–4 win on penalties (0–0 after full-time) against BK Häcken in the final. He featured in all six games as the side reached the play-off round of the 2021–22 UEFA Europa Conference League, after eliminating Maribor (4–1 on aggregate) and FK Čukarički (6–4 on aggregate, in which Ludwigson scored), where the club was knocked out by Basel (4–4 on aggregate) after a penalty shoot-out. On 23 September 2021, Ludwigson was appointed as the new vice-captain of Hammarby by head coach Miloš Milojević. Ludwigson was named Hammarby Player of the Year for a second consecutive season, being only the second ever player to win the prize twice beside Max von Schlebrügge.

2022
On 4 March 2022, Ludwigson signed a new five-year contract with Hammarby, running until the end of 2026. In the process, he reportedly turned down a move to Ulsan Hyundai. Ludwigson featured in the final of the 2021–22 Svenska Cupen, in which Hammarby lost by 4–5 on penalties to Malmö FF after the game ended in a 0–0 draw.

Ulsan Hyundai
On 5 January 2023, Ludwigson transferred to K League 1 club Ulsan Hyundai, linking up with his former teammate Darijan Bojanić. The transfer fee was reportedly set at around 6 million SEK, after the Korean club activated a release clause in Ludwigson's contract.

International career
Ludwigson was called up to the Sweden national team for the training tour in Portugal in early 2022, that later was cancelled due to the COVID-19 pandemic.

Personal life
Ludwigson is the great-grandson of footballer Robert Zander, who represented Sweden in the 1920 and 1924 Summer Olympics.

Career statistics

Club

Honours
Hammarby IF
 Svenska Cupen: 2020–21
Individual
 Hammarby IF Player of the Year: 2020, 2021
Allsvenskan Top assist provider: 2020

References

External links

1993 births
Living people
Association football forwards
Swedish footballers
Allsvenskan players
Superettan players
Örgryte IS players
Hammarby Fotboll players
Ulsan Hyundai FC players
K League 1 players
Footballers from Gothenburg
Swedish expatriate footballers
Expatriate footballers in South Korea
Swedish expatriates in South Korea